Tākaka is a small town situated at the southeastern end of Golden Bay, at the northern end of New Zealand's South Island, located on the lower reaches of the Tākaka River. State Highway 60 runs through Takaka  and  follows the river valley before climbing over Tākaka Hill, to Motueka (57 km away) linking Golden Bay with the more populated coast of Tasman Bay / Te Tai-o-Aorere to the southeast. The town is served by Takaka Aerodrome.

History
The name of the town may derive from Taha'a island in the Society Islands in French Polynesia. A local myth about a taniwha in the nearby Parapara River is similar to one told about the Parapara strait, which separates Taha'a from Motue'a island.

From 1853 to 1876, Tākaka was administered as part of the Nelson Province. Sawmilling was an important business for Takaka in the 1870s. The Takaka tramway was built in 1880. Prior to that time timber was transported to the port by teams of bullocks which would often leave the main street of Takaka looking like a rutted bog. After flooding in 1904 did significant damage to the tramway, it was sold in 1905 and the locomotive, rolling stock and rails were shipped to Onehunga by sea.

Takaka contributed soldiers to the Boer War, the First World War and the Second World War with 1, 44 and 25 respectively dying in each conflict.

In June 2005, much of the town was temporarily evacuated after fire swept through Tākaka's biggest industrial complex, a dairy factory. There were fears that volatile chemicals stored at the plant might explode, leading to the release of poisonous gases, which later proved to be unfounded.

In July 2020, the name of the town was officially gazetted as Tākaka by the New Zealand Geographic Board.

Geography
The area around Tākaka Hill has a cave system, including New Zealand's deepest vertical shaft, Harwoods Hole.

Tākaka and Golden Bay are known for rock climbing, particularly around the area of Paines Ford.

The town is also known for Te Waikoropupū Springs (colloquially known as Pupu Springs).

The antipode of Tākaka is the town of Coriscada, Portugal.

Climate
Takaka is one of the warmest locations in the South Island, due to its northerly position and maritime influences from the Golden Bay.
Because of the hills in the Kahurangi National Park to the south-west of Takaka, the town receives substantially less rainfall than the West Coast. Takaka's location on the leeward side of these hills allow the wind to become warmer and drier as it flows down towards the town, allowing an average of 22 days a year to exceed 26.7 °C (80 °F). On the contrary, being a few kilometres inland, cold air can settle over Takaka on winter mornings, resulting in an average of 17.2 frosty days per year.

Economy
Farming, sawmilling, limestone quarrying and tourism are major local industries. The area around Tākaka is mineral-rich, with gold, iron ore, copper, silver and asbestos all found locally, although not all in commercially viable amounts.

Dairy factory 

There is also a small Fonterra factory located in the township of Tākaka that produces skim milk powder. There are 83 dairy farms supplying the factory, which can process about  a day into skim milk powder. Cream is produced as a by-product, and is shipped to the Clandeboye factory for further processing. The $80 million Takaka dairy factory was damaged by a fire in 2005. More than 60 firefighters battled the fire, which was caused by contractors completing welding work. It has subsequently been rebuilt. In 2009, it was reported that it employed nearly 50 staff and contributed $3 million in wages to the local economy.

Demographics 

Tākaka had a population of 1,335 at the 2018 New Zealand census, an increase of 99 people (8.0%) since the 2013 census, and an increase of 183 people (15.9%) since the 2006 census. There were 552 households. There were 657 males and 678 females, giving a sex ratio of 0.97 males per female. The median age was 47 years (compared with 37.4 years nationally), with 222 people (16.6%) aged under 15 years, 189 (14.2%) aged 15 to 29, 621 (46.5%) aged 30 to 64, and 306 (22.9%) aged 65 or older.

Ethnicities were 94.8% European/Pākehā, 10.8% Māori, 1.1% Pacific peoples, 2.0% Asian, and 2.5% other ethnicities (totals add to more than 100% since people could identify with multiple ethnicities).

The proportion of people born overseas was 18.4%, compared with 27.1% nationally.

Although some people objected to giving their religion, 64.5% had no religion, 24.9% were Christian, 0.2% were Hindu, 1.1% were Buddhist and 1.8% had other religions.

Of those at least 15 years old, 177 (15.9%) people had a bachelor or higher degree, and 243 (21.8%) people had no formal qualifications. The median income was $24,800, compared with $31,800 nationally. The employment status of those at least 15 was that 483 (43.4%) people were employed full-time, 219 (19.7%) were part-time, and 27 (2.4%) were unemployed.

Education

There is also a primary school in nearby Motupipi.

Features

Golden Bay Museum 

The Golden Bay Museum has displays on Abel Tasman's 1642 voyage which visited Golden Bay and Golden Bay's industrial past and a pilot whale skeleton. It opened in 1990, and is owned and funded by Tasman District Council.

Labyrinth Rocks park 

The Labyrinth Rocks park is located on Scott Road. It is a two hectare park of limestone rock formations and native bush. The canyons have a maze-like quality and there are trails that run through them and link them all. There are a number of short tunnels and archways. Entrance was free in 2021.

Paines Ford swimming hole and rock climbing 

Paines Ford (also known as Paynes Ford) is a swimming hole and rock climbing spot on the confluence of the Waingara and Takaka rivers. An easy trail from the carpark follows the route of a tramline, that existed to haul timber out of the surrounding forest in the early 1880s, to a number of swimming holes surrounded by limestone rock formations. Alternatively, it is about a 20 minutes walk from Tākaka. Paines Ford has over 200 bolted climbs. The most famous climb is 1080 and the letter G because of its unique "no-hands-rest" at the top and its views of Golden Bay.

Notable buildings

Masonic lodge 

The Masonic lodge was originally built as a cinema in 1926 outside the town boundary, as for reasons unknown, a cinema was not permitted in the town. It was a popular addition to the town before being sold in 1937 and became the Masonic lodge. The Collingwood Lodge and the Takaka Lodge merged in 1972 became the Golden Bay Lodge No 144.

Golden Bay theatre 
The Golden Bay theatre was opened in May 1927. Electricity became available in 1929 with a petrol engine used prior to this to provide power. When television arrived, theatre numbers declined and it was used for other public functions. In 1978 it was converted into a cafe and art gallery.

Bank of New Zealand 

The Bank of New Zealand first engaged in business in Takaka in 1884 based in a local hotel. The bank moved into the premises pictured in 1915. The building was built out of reinforced concrete supplied by the Golden Bay Cement Company. Gas lighting was initially used and this was replaced with electric lighting in 1930. The bank survived the Murchison earthquake of 1929 without any structural damage. In 1983 floods entered the bank but did little damage. The building is currently used as an art gallery.

Golden Bay Electricity Board building 

On this site in Commercial Street was originally a blacksmith. In 1929, the Golden Bay Electricity Board opened the building and occupied it until 2000. It is now occupied by the Department of Conservation.

Telegraph Hotel 

The Telegraph Hotel was built over 100 years ago.

Church of the Epiphany 

The Anglican church of the Epiphany is situated on Commercial Street. It was consecrated by the Bishop of Nelson in 1884. It was built from locally sawn matai and totara timber. A bell tower was added in 1900 and by 1960 the timber was covered in stucco. The bell tower was replaced in 1966 and the church was extended in 2002.

Sacred Heart Catholic Church 

The Church of the Sacred Heart was built using locally sourced marble in 1917. The church requires structural strengthening to bring it up to the building code requirements and has not been used since 2011.

St Andrew's Presbyterian Church 

St Andrew's is located on Commercial Street, Takaka.

Eureka boarding house 

The Eureka boarding house was built in 1906. A milk bar was added to the front of the building in the 1950s. It has since been modified further to provide more shop frontage.

Golf course 
The Takaka golf course had a number of homes on local farms before shifting to Crown land at Clifton that was able to be rented for a token amount in perpetuity in 1959.

References

Populated places in the Tasman District

Populated places around Golden Bay / Mohua